EBV may refer to:

Biology and medicine
 Epstein–Barr virus, of the herpes family
 Estimated breeding value in animal breeding
 Essential Biodiversity Variables, used in monitoring biodiversity
 Endobronchial valve, a medical implant for a lung

Other
 Escuela Bella Vista, a school in Maracaibo, Venezuela
 Eschweiler Bergwerksverein, the Eschweiler Coal Mining Company, in Germany
 Ebbw Vale Parkway railway station, Wales (station code)
 EBV Elektronik, a German distributor of electronic components (subsidiary of Avnet)
 Eliza Bryant Village, United States, a home for elderly people of color